Baron Marney (or Baron Marny) was a title in the Peerage of England. It was created in 1523 for Sir Henry Marney. The title became extinct on the death of his son, the second Baron, in 1525.

Barons Marney (1523)
Henry Marney, 1st Baron Marney (c. 1447–1523)
John Marney, 2nd Baron Marney (1480-1525)

References

1523 establishments in England
Extinct baronies in the Peerage of England
Noble titles created in 1523